Matěj Polidar (born 20 December 1999) is a Czech footballer who plays as a midfielder for Jablonec on loan from Sparta Prague.

Club career

1. FK Příbram
He made his debut for the first team on 17 March 2019 in the Czech First League match against SK Slavia Prague.  

Since then he played in 18 league matches (scoring 1 goal) and in 1 Czech Cup match (without scoring a goal).

AC Sparta Prague
On 8 September 2019 he moved to AC Sparta Prague in Czech First League. He made his debut for the first team on 28 September 2020 in the Czech First League match against his former club 1. FK Příbram. 

Since then he played in 5 league matches, 1 Czech Cup match and in 3 2020-21 UEFA Europa League group stage matches against LOSC Lille, AC Milan and Celtic Glasgow (without scoring a goal). He also played in 3 matches (scoring 2 goals) for the reserve team in Bohemian Football League (actual to 21 January 2021).

1. FK Příbram (loan)
On 9 September 2019 he was loaned back to 1. FK Příbram in Czech First League. In one year long loan he played in 24 league matches scoring 1 goal.

FK Jablonec (loan)
On 20 June 2022 he was loaned to Jablonec in Czech First League.

International career
He had played international football at under-20 level for Czech Republic U20. He played in 1 match without scoring a goal.

Career statistics

Club

References

External links
 https://repre.fotbal.cz/hrac/hraci/16332806
 

1999 births
Living people
Czech footballers
Czech Republic youth international footballers
Association football midfielders
Czech First League players
AC Sparta Prague players
1. FK Příbram players
FK Jablonec players